Terrence Tessora, better known by his stage name Tes, is an American rapper from Brooklyn, New York.

In 2003, Tes released his debut album, X2. It was described by Exclaim! as "experimental New York hip-hop in the vein of Cannibal Ox, Aesop Rock and Company Flow."

Discography
Studio albums
X2 (2003)

Mixtapes
A Trbie Called Tes (2011)

EPs
Take Home Tes (2000)
Sound Investments (2001)
Pro Tes (2005)

Singles
"New New York" (2003)

Guest appearances
Funkstörung - "Chopping Heads" and "Fat Camp Feva" from Disconnected (2004)
Para One - "Beat Down" from Epiphanie (2006)
Krazy Baldhead - "2nd Movement Part 2" from The B-Suite (2009)

Productions
Subtitle - "Pill Pop" from Terrain to Roam (2006)

References

External links

Alternative hip hop musicians
American hip hop record producers
Rappers from Brooklyn
Living people
21st-century American rappers
Record producers from New York (state)
Year of birth missing (living people)
Lex Records artists